This Never Ending Now is the second acoustic album and sixth and final studio album overall by English rock band the Chameleons. It was released on 1 September 2002 on record label Paradiso. It consists of acoustic reworkings of songs from their early albums and singles as well as featuring a cover of David Bowie's "Moonage Daydream".

Release and reception 

This Never Ending Now was released on 1 September 2002 by record label Paradiso.

Ned Raggett of AllMusic called it "another lovely alternate visit into some of the band's strongest songs old and new". musicOMH was generally favourable, writing "while this is an essential purchase for any fan, it also makes a good introduction for the uninitiated."

Track listing

Personnel 
 The Chameleons

 Mark Burgess – vocals, bass guitar, guitar, production, liner notes
 Dave Fielding – guitar, keyboard, harmonica, backing vocals, production
 John Lever – drums, percussion
 Reg Smithies – guitar, backing vocals

 Additional personnel

 Kwasi Asante – additional vocals
 Natalie – backing vocals

 Technical

 John Delf – production, engineering, mixing

References

External links 

 Liner notes
 

The Chameleons albums
2002 albums